A list of horror films released in 1974.

References

Sources

 

 

Lists of horror films by year